Oldhamite is a calcium magnesium sulfide mineral with the chemical formula . Ferrous iron may also be present in the mineral resulting in the chemical formula . It is a pale to dark brown accessory mineral in meteorites. It crystallizes in the cubic crystal system, but typically occurs as anhedral grains between other minerals.

Discovery and occurrence
It was first described in 1862 for an occurrence in the Bustee meteorite, Gorakhpur, Uttar Pradesh, India. It was named for Irish geologist Thomas Oldham (1816–1878), the Director of the Indian Geological Survey.

It occurs as an interstitial mineral phase between silicate minerals in enstatite chondrite and achondrite meteorites. It occurs in association  with enstatite, augite, niningerite, osbornite, troilite, gypsum and calcite. It has been reported from a variety of meteorite locations around the world including the Allan Hills 84001 meteorite of Antarctica. It has also been reported from a slag occurrence in France and a coal deposit in Poland.

See also
 Glossary of meteoritics

References

Meteorite minerals
Sulfide minerals
Cubic minerals
Minerals in space group 225
Galena group